The perennial philosophy, also referred to as perennialism and perennial wisdom, is a perspective in philosophy and spirituality that views all of the world's religious traditions as sharing a single, metaphysical truth or origin from which all esoteric and exoteric knowledge and doctrine has grown.

Perennialism has its roots in the Renaissance interest in neo-Platonism and its idea of the One, from which all existence emerges. Marsilio Ficino (1433–1499) sought to integrate Hermeticism with Greek and Jewish-Christian thought, discerning a prisca theologia which could be found in all ages. Giovanni Pico della Mirandola (1463–94) suggested that truth could be found in many, rather than just two, traditions. He proposed a harmony between the thought of Plato and Aristotle, and saw aspects of the prisca theologia in Averroes (Ibn Rushd), the Quran, the Kabbalah and other sources. Agostino Steuco (1497–1548) coined the term philosophia perennis.

A more popular interpretation argues for universalism, the idea that all religions, underneath seeming differences, point to the same Truth. In the early 19th century the Transcendentalists propagated the idea of a metaphysical Truth and universalism, which inspired the Unitarians, who proselytized among Indian elites. Towards the end of the 19th century, the Theosophical Society further popularized universalism, not only in the western world, but also in western colonies. In the 20th century, universalism was further popularized through the Advaita Vedanta and Sufism inspired Traditionalist School, which argued for a metaphysical, single origin of the orthodox religions, and by Aldous Huxley and his book The Perennial Philosophy, which was inspired by neo-Vedanta.

Definition

Renaissance
The idea of a perennial philosophy originated with a number of Renaissance theologians who took inspiration from neo-Platonism and from the theory of Forms. Marsilio Ficino (1433–1499) argued that there is an underlying unity to the world, the soul or love, which has a counterpart in the realm of ideas. According to Giovanni Pico della Mirandola (1463–1494), a student of Ficino, truth could be found in many, rather than just two, traditions. According to Agostino Steuco (1497–1548) there is "one principle of all things, of which there has always been one and the same knowledge among all peoples."

Aldous Huxley and mystical universalism
One such universalist was Aldous Huxley, who propagated a universalist interpretation of the world religions, inspired by Vivekananda's neo-Vedanta and his own use of psychedelic drugs. According to Huxley, who popularized the idea of a perennial philosophy with a larger audience,

In Huxley's 1944 essay in Vedanta and the West, he describes "The Minimum Working Hypothesis", the basic outline of the perennial philosophy found in all the mystic branches of the religions of the world:

Origins

The perennial philosophy originates from a blending of neo-Platonism and Christianity. Neo-Platonism itself has diverse origins in the syncretic culture of the Hellenistic period, and was an influential philosophy throughout the Middle Ages.

Classical world

Hellenistic period: religious syncretism

During the Hellenistic period, Alexander the Great's campaigns brought about exchange of cultural ideas on its path throughout most of the known world of his era. The Greek Eleusinian Mysteries and Dionysian Mysteries mixed with such influences as the Cult of Isis, Mithraism and Hinduism, along with some Persian influences. Such cross-cultural exchange was not new to the Greeks; the Egyptian god Osiris and the Greek god Dionysus had been equated as Osiris-Dionysus by the historian Herodotus as early as the 5th century BC (see Interpretatio graeca).

Roman world: Philo of Alexandria
Philo of Alexandria (c.25 BCE – c.50 CE) attempted to reconcile Greek Rationalism with the Torah, which helped pave the way for Christianity with neoplatonism, and the adoption of the Old Testament with Christianity, as opposed to Gnostic roots of Christianity. Philo translated Judaism into terms of Stoic, Platonic and neopythagorean elements, and held that God is "supra rational" and can be reached only through "ecstasy." He also held that the oracles of God supply the material of moral and religious knowledge.

Neoplatonism

Neoplatonism arose in the 3rd century CE and persisted until shortly after the closing of the Platonic Academy in Athens in AD 529 by Justinian I. Neoplatonists were heavily influenced by Plato, but also by the Platonic tradition that thrived during the six centuries which separated the first of the neoplatonists from Plato. The work of neoplatonic philosophy involved describing the derivation of the whole of reality from a single principle, "the One." It was founded by Plotinus, and has been very influential throughout history. In the Middle Ages, neoplatonic ideas were integrated into the philosophical and theological works of many of the most important medieval Islamic, Christian, and Jewish thinkers.

Renaissance

Ficino and Pico della Mirandola
Marsilio Ficino (1433–1499) believed that Hermes Trismegistos, the supposed author of the Corpus Hermeticum, was a contemporary of Moses and the teacher of Pythagoras, and the source of both Greek and Jewish-Christian thought. He argued that there is an underlying unity to the world, the soul or love, which has a counterpart in the realm of ideas. Platonic Philosophy and Christian theology both embody this truth. Ficino was influenced by a variety of philosophers including Aristotelian Scholasticism and various pseudonymous and mystical writings. Ficino saw his thought as part of a long development of philosophical truth, of ancient pre-Platonic philosophers (including Zoroaster, Hermes Trismegistus, Orpheus, Aglaophemus and Pythagoras) who reached their peak in Plato. The Prisca theologia, or venerable and ancient theology, which embodied the truth and could be found in all ages, was a vitally important idea for Ficino.

Giovanni Pico della Mirandola (1463–1494), a student of Ficino, went further than his teacher by suggesting that truth could be found in many, rather than just two, traditions. This proposed a harmony between the thought of Plato and Aristotle, and saw aspects of the Prisca theologia in Averroes, the Koran and the Kabbalah among other sources. After the deaths of Pico and Ficino this line of thought expanded, and included Symphorien Champier, and Francesco Giorgio.

Steuco

De perenni philosophia libri X
The term perenni philosophia was first used by Agostino Steuco (1497–1548) who used it to title a treatise, De perenni philosophia libri X, published in 1540. De perenni philosophia was the most sustained attempt at philosophical synthesis and harmony. Steuco represents the renaissance humanist side of 16th-century Biblical scholarship and theology, although he rejected Luther and Calvin. De perenni philosophia, is a complex work which only contains the term philosophia perennis twice. It states that there is "one principle of all things, of which there has always been one and the same knowledge among all peoples." This single knowledge (or sapientia) is the key element in his philosophy. In that he emphasises continuity over progress, Steuco's idea of philosophy is not one conventionally associated with the Renaissance. Indeed, he tends to believe that the truth is lost over time and is only preserved in the prisci theologica. Steuco preferred Plato to Aristotle and saw greater congruence between the former and Christianity than the latter philosopher. He held that philosophy works in harmony with religion and should lead to knowledge of God, and that truth flows from a single source, more ancient than the Greeks. Steuco was strongly influenced by Iamblichus's statement that knowledge of God is innate in all, and also gave great importance to Hermes Trismegistus.

Influence
Steuco's perennial philosophy was highly regarded by some scholars for the two centuries after its publication, then largely forgotten until it was rediscovered by Otto Willmann in the late part of the 19th century. Overall, De perenni philosophia wasn't particularly influential, and largely confined to those with a similar orientation to himself. The work was not put on the Index of works banned by the Roman Catholic Church, although his Cosmopoeia which expressed similar ideas was. Religious criticisms tended to the conservative view that held Christian teachings should be understood as unique, rather than seeing them as perfect expressions of truths that are found everywhere. More generally, this philosophical syncretism was set out at the expense of some of the doctrines included within it, and it is possible that Steuco's critical faculties were not up to the task he had set himself. Further, placing so much confidence in the prisca theologia, turned out to be a shortcoming as many of the texts used in this school of thought later turned out to be bogus. In the following two centuries the most favourable responses were largely Protestant and often in England.

Gottfried Leibniz later picked up on Steuco's term. The German philosopher stands in the tradition of this concordistic philosophy; his philosophy of harmony especially had affinity with Steuco's ideas. Leibniz knew about Steuco's work by 1687, but thought that De la vérité de la religion chrétienne by Huguenot philosopher Phillippe du Plessis-Mornay expressed the same truth better. Steuco's influence can be found throughout Leibniz's works, but the German was the first philosopher to refer to the perennial philosophy without mentioning the Italian.

Popularisation

Transcendentalism and Unitarian Universalism

Ralph Waldo Emerson (1803–1882) was a pioneer of the idea of spirituality as a distinct field. He was one of the major figures in Transcendentalism, which was rooted in English and German Romanticism, the Biblical criticism of Herder and Schleiermacher, and the skepticism of Hume. The Transcendentalists emphasised an intuitive, experiential approach of religion. Following Schleiermacher, an individual's intuition of truth was taken as the criterion for truth. The Transcendentalists were largely inspired by Thomas Carlyle (1795–1881), whose Critical and Miscellaneous Essays popularised German Romanticism in English and whose Sartor Resartus (1833–34) was a pioneer work of Western perennialism. They also read and were influenced by Hindu texts, the first translations of which appeared in the late 18th and early 19th century. They also endorsed universalist and Unitarian ideas, leading in the 20th Century to Unitarian Universalism. Universalism holds the idea that there must be truth in other religions as well, since a loving God would redeem all living beings, not just Christians.

Theosophical Society

By the end of the 19th century, the idea of a perennial philosophy was popularized by leaders of the Theosophical Society such as H. P. Blavatsky and Annie Besant, under the name of "Wisdom-Religion" or "Ancient Wisdom". The Theosophical Society took an active interest in Asian religions, subsequently not only bringing those religions under the attention of a western audience but also influencing Hinduism and Buddhism in Sri Lanka and Japan.

Neo-Vedanta

Many perennialist thinkers (including Armstrong, Huston Smith and Joseph Campbell) are influenced by Hindu reformer Ram Mohan Roy and Hindu mystics Ramakrishna and Swami Vivekananda, who themselves have taken over western notions of universalism. They regarded Hinduism to be a token of this perennial philosophy. This notion has influenced thinkers who have proposed versions of the perennial philosophy in the 20th century.

The unity of all religions was a central impulse among Hindu reformers in the 19th century, who in turn influenced many 20th-century perennial philosophy-type thinkers. Key figures in this reforming movement included two Bengali Brahmins. Ram Mohan Roy, a philosopher and the founder of the modernising Brahmo Samaj religious organisation, reasoned that the divine was beyond description and thus that no religion could claim a monopoly in their understanding of it.

The mystic Ramakrishna's spiritual ecstasies included experiencing the sameness of Christ, Mohammed and his own Hindu deity. Ramakrishna's most famous disciple, Swami Vivekananda, travelled to the United States in the 1890s where he formed the Vedanta Society.

Roy, Ramakrishna and Vivekananda were all influenced by the Hindu school of Advaita Vedanta, which they saw as the exemplification of a Universalist Hindu religiosity.

Traditionalist School

The Traditionalist School is a group of 20th- and 21st-century thinkers concerned with what they consider to be the demise of traditional forms of knowledge, both aesthetic and spiritual, within Western society. The early proponents of this school are René Guénon, Ananda Coomaraswamy and Frithjof Schuon. Other important thinkers in this tradition include Titus Burckhardt, Martin Lings, Seyyed Hossein Nasr, Jean-Louis Michon, Marco Pallis, Huston Smith, Jean Borella, Elémire Zolla and Julius Evola. According to the Traditionalist School, orthodox religions are based on a singular metaphysical origin. According to the Traditionalist School, the "philosophia perennis" designates a worldview that is opposed to the scientism of modern secular societies and which promotes the rediscovery of the wisdom traditions of the pre-secular developed world. This view is exemplified by René Guénon in his 1945 book The Reign of Quantity and the Signs of the Times, one of the founding works of the Traditionalist School.

According to Frithjof Schuon:

The Traditionalist School continues this metaphysical orientation. According to this school, the perennial philosophy is "absolute Truth and infinite Presence". Absolute Truth is "the perennial wisdom (sophia perennis) that stands as the transcendent source of all the intrinsically orthodox religions of humankind." Infinite Presence is "the perennial religion (religio perennis) that lives within the heart of all intrinsically orthodox religions." The Traditionalist School discerns a transcendent and an immanent dimension, namely the discernment of the Real or Absolute, c.q. that which is permanent; and the intentional "mystical concentration on the Real".

According to Soares de Azevedo, the perennialist philosophy states that the universal truth is the same within each of the world's orthodox religious traditions, and is the foundation of their religious knowledge and doctrine. Each world religion is an interpretation of this universal truth, adapted to cater for the psychological, intellectual, and social needs of a given culture of a given period of history. This perennial truth has been rediscovered in each epoch by mystics of all kinds who have revived already existing religions, when they had fallen into empty platitudes and hollow ceremonialism.

Shipley further notes that the Traditionalist School is oriented on orthodox traditions, and rejects modern syncretism and universalism, which together create new religions from older religions and compromise the standing traditions.

Aldous Huxley

The term was popularized in the mid-twentieth century by Aldous Huxley, who was profoundly influenced by Vivekananda's Neo-Vedanta and Universalism. In his 1945 book The Perennial Philosophy he defined the perennial philosophy as:

In contrast to the Traditionalist school, Huxley emphasized mystical experience over metaphysics:

According to Aldous Huxley, in order to apprehend the divine reality, one must choose to fulfill certain conditions: "making themselves loving, pure in heart and poor in spirit." Huxley argues that very few people can achieve this state.  Those who have fulfilled these conditions, grasped the universal truth and interpreted it have generally been given the name of saint, prophet, sage or enlightened one. Huxley argues that those who have, "modified their merely human mode of being," and have thus been able to comprehend "more than merely human kind and amount of knowledge" have also achieved this enlightened state.

New Age

The idea of a perennial philosophy is central to the New Age Movement. The New Age movement is a Western spiritual movement that developed in the second half of the 20th century. Its central precepts have been described as "drawing on both Eastern and Western spiritual and metaphysical traditions and infusing them with influences from self-help and motivational psychology, holistic health, parapsychology, consciousness research and quantum physics". The term New Age refers to the coming astrological Age of Aquarius.

The New Age aims to create "a spirituality without borders or confining dogmas" that is inclusive and pluralistic. It holds to "a holistic worldview", emphasising that the Mind, Body and Spirit are interrelated and that there is a form of monism and unity throughout the universe. It attempts to create "a worldview that includes both science and spirituality" and embraces a number of forms of mainstream science as well as other forms of science that are considered fringe.

Academic discussions

Mystical experience

The idea of a perennial philosophy, sometimes called perennialism, is a key area of debate in the academic discussion of mystical experience. Huston Smith notes that the Traditionalist School's vision of a perennial philosophy is not based on mystical experiences, but on metaphysical intuitions. The discussion of mystical experience has shifted the emphasis in the perennial philosophy from these metaphysical intuitions to religious experience and the notion of nonduality or altered state of consciousness.

William James popularized the use of the term "religious experience" in his 1902 book The Varieties of Religious Experience. It has also influenced the understanding of mysticism as a distinctive experience which supplies knowledge. Writers such as W.T. Stace, Huston Smith, and Robert Forman argue that there are core similarities to mystical experience across religions, cultures and eras. For Stace the universality of this core experience is a necessary, although not sufficient, condition for one to be able to trust the cognitive content of any religious experience.

Wayne Proudfoot traces the roots of the notion of "religious experience" further back to the German theologian Friedrich Schleiermacher (1768–1834), who argued that religion is based on a feeling of the infinite. The notion of "religious experience" was used by Schleiermacher to defend religion against the growing scientific and secular critique. It was adopted by many scholars of religion, of which William James was the most influential.

Critics point out that the emphasis on "experience" favours the atomic individual, instead of the community. It also fails to distinguish between episodic experience, and mysticism as a process, embedded in a total religious matrix of liturgy, scripture, worship, virtues, theology, rituals and practices. Richard King also points to disjunction between "mystical experience" and social justice:

Religious pluralism

Religious pluralism holds that various world religions are limited by their distinctive historical and cultural contexts and thus there is no single, true religion.  There are only many equally valid religions. Each religion is a direct result of humanity's attempt to grasp and understand the incomprehensible divine reality. Therefore, each religion has an authentic but ultimately inadequate perception of divine reality, producing a partial understanding of the universal truth, which requires syncretism to achieve a complete understanding as well as a path towards salvation or spiritual enlightenment.

Although perennial philosophy also holds that there is no single true religion, it differs when discussing divine reality. Perennial philosophy states that a divine reality can be understood and that its existence is what allows the universal truth to be understood.  Each religion provides its own interpretation of the universal truth, based on its historical and cultural context, potentially providing everything required to observe the divine reality and achieve a state in which one will be able to confirm the universal truth and achieve salvation or spiritual enlightenment.

Evidence for perennial philosophy 
Cognitive archeology such as analysis of cave paintings and other pre-historic art and customs suggests that a form of perennial philosophy or Shamanic metaphysics may stretch back to the birth of behavioral modernity, all around the world. Similar beliefs are found in present-day "stone age" cultures such as Aboriginal Australians. Perennial philosophy postulates the existence of a spirit or concept world alongside the day-to-day world, and interactions between these worlds during dreaming and ritual, or on special days or at special places. It has been argued that perennial philosophy formed the basis for Platonism, with Plato articulating, rather than creating, much older widespread beliefs.

See also 

 Ivan Aguéli
 Archetypes
 Alice Bailey
 Annie Beasant
 Helena Blavatsky
 Titus Burckhardt
 Suheil Bushrui
 Olavo de Carvalho
 Henry Corbin
 Benjamin Creme
 Julius Evola
 Evolutionism
 J. N. Findlay
 Four Noble Truths
 Gautama Buddha 
 René Guénon
 Angus Macnab
 Maitreya
 Meaning of life
 Jean-Louis Michon
 Michel de Montaigne
 Hossein Nasr
 Rudolf Otto
 Whitall Perry 
 Kathleen Raine
 Religious experience
 Religious pluralism
 Helena Roerich
 Frithjof Schuon
 Huston Smith
 Mateus Soares de Azevedo
 Edith Stein
 William Stoddart
 Syncretism
 The Teachings of the Mystics
 Traditionalist School
 Transcendentalism
 Transpersonal psychology
 Wilbur Marshall Urban
 Wisdom tradition
 R. C. Zaehner
 Elémire Zolla
 Educational perennialism
 Urreligion

Notes

References

Sources

Printed sources

 

 

 James S. Cutsinger, The Fullness of God: Frithjof Schuon on Christianity, Bloomington, Indiana: World Wisdom, 2004

 

 Ranjit Fernando (ed.) (1991), The Unanimous Tradition, Essays on the essential unity of all religions. Sri Lanka Institute of Traditional Studies, 1991 

 
 
 
 
 John Holman (2008), The Return of the Perennial Philosophy: The Supreme Vision of Western Esotericism. Watkins Publishing, 

 
 Perennial Philosophy, Brenda Jackson, Ronald L McDonald, Penguin Group (USA) 

 

 
 The other perennial philosophy: a metaphysical dialectic, Author	Alan M. Laibelman, University Press of America, (2000), 

 
 "The Mystery of the Two Natures", in Barry McDonald (ed.), Every Branch in Me: Essays on the Meaning of Man, Bloomington, Indiana: World Wisdom, 2002
 

 Frithjof Schuon and the Perennial Philosophy, Authors Harry Oldmeadow and William Stoddart, Contributor	William Stoddart, Publisher World Wisdom, Inc, (2010) 

 
 Whitall N. Perry, A Treasury of Traditional Wisdom, Louisville, Kentucky: Fons Vitae, 2001

Web-sources

Further reading
Traditionalist School
 Martin Lings, The Underlying Religion: An Introduction to the Perennial Philosophy, 
 William W. Quinn, junior. The Only Tradition, in S.U.N.Y. Series in Western Esoteric Traditions. Albany, N.Y.: State University of New York Press, 1997. xix, 384 p.  pbk
 Samuel Bendeck Sotillos, Psychology and the Perennial Philosophy: Studies in Comparative Religion (Bloomington, IN: World Wisdom, 2013). 
 Zachary Markwith, "Muslim Intellectuals and the Perennial Philosophy in the Twentieth Century", Sophia Perennis Vol. 1, N° 1 (Tehran: Iranian Institute of Philosophy, 2009).
Aldous Huxley

External links

Kabbalah and the Perennial Philosophy
Slideshow on the Perennial Philosophy
The End of Philosophy by Swami Tripurari
Religious Pluralism and the Question of Religious Truth in Wilfred C. Smith
James S. Cutsinger Perennial Philosophy and Christianity
OSHO discourses on Philosophia Perennis 
Perennial philosophy Essay by Jules Evans, aeon.co

 
Neoplatonism
Neo-Vedanta
Nondualism
Philosophy of religion
Religious pluralism
Traditionalist School